The French Kissers is a 2009 French teen sex comedy film co-written and directed by Riad Sattouf, in his feature directorial debut. The film follows Hervé (Vincent Lacoste), an average teenage boy who has little luck with finding a girlfriend until the beautiful Aurore (Alice Trémolières) takes a liking to him.

Sattouf, a graphic novel writer, was invited to write a script based on an idea from producer Anne-Dominique Toussaint, and he completed the screenplay with Marc Syrigas. Sattouf cast non-professional actors as the film's teenage characters, but he chose to use experienced actors such as Noémie Lvovsky, Irène Jacob, Emmanuelle Devos and Valeria Golino as the adult characters. Filming took place over eight weeks in Gagny and Rennes.

The film was released in France on 10 June 2009, and a soundtrack composed by Flairs was released on 8 June 2009. The film was well received by critics, who particularly praised the humour, the acting and the cinematography.

It won the 2010 César Award for Best First Feature Film and Lacoste also received a nomination for the César Award for Most Promising Actor. It also won the Prix Jacques Prévert du Scénario for Best Adaptation in 2010.

Plot
Hervé (Vincent Lacoste) is a teenage boy in junior high school with ordinary looks and middling grades, living with his single mother in a housing estate in Rennes. He and his best friend Camel (Anthony Sonigo) often fantasize about their female classmates and their mothers, but have less luck with girls in reality.

Hervé unsuccessfully pursues romances with various girls at his school, including with Laura (Julie Scheibling), who accepts his offer of a date as a joke. After Aurore (Alice Trémolières), a beautiful and popular girl at school, asks him on a date, they embark on an awkward relationship. Although Hervé and Camel are frequent masturbators, while both alone and together, Hervé and Aurore are slow to engage in sexual activity beyond kissing. Aurore eventually breaks up with Hervé when his friends try to grope her in a game of Dungeons & Dragons and she discovers that he lied to them about having sex with her.

The film concludes with the characters in high school; Hervé is dating Sabrina, Camel is dating Jenifer, Aurore is dating Wulfran, and Hervé's mother is married to Anas's father.

Cast

French astronaut Jean-Pierre Haigneré makes a cameo appearance as the Physics professor.

Production

Graphic novel writer Riad Sattouf had studied animation and had dreams of filmmaking, but he thought that it would be too exhausting to write and re-write a script, find producers, find funding and censor his ideas to please others. Sattouf had rejected several film offers before because they lacked creative freedom, but he agreed when he was contacted by Anne-Dominique Toussaint, a film producer and a fan of Sattouf's graphic novels who wanted to make a teen film. Sattouf wrote the first draft of the script and then asked screenwriter Marc Syrigas to help him to re-write it. Rather than make a film about "the codes of today's teens, the way they talk, [or] their arsenal of electronic devices", Sattouf wanted to focus on "the intensity of their emotions". He wanted to depict "the things that happen during teenage-hood that we don't show so often".

Casting all of the characters in The French Kissers took place over three months. Sattouf cast the teenage characters through casting agent Stéphane Batut – whose team he described as "experts in casting teenagers" – and chose from taped auditions of 500 Parisian high school students. He did not want to work with professional actors who he feared would be egotistical and may have thought that he was not legitimate as a first-time director. He wanted to cast unknown actors due to his "phobia of stars", but after considering that he might not make another film, he asked Emmanuelle Devos, Irene Jacob and Valeria Golino to appear in the film and they all accepted. Sattouf sought actors who were "ugly ducklings with unusual features, and their own way of talking, of walking" and who could express emotions without "acting". He struggled to find teenage actors who were like their characters and were willing to be filmed in an unflattering way. He said that Vincent Lacoste and Anthony Sonigo were less concerned about their appearances when he showed them a picture of himself as a "very ugly" teenager. Three days before the beginning of principal photography, Lacoste broke his knee at a music concert, and so his resulting limp was added to the character. According to Sattouf, Lacoste and Sonigo were completely at ease with filming scenes of masturbation, and all of the actors treated their French kisses "like a hug".

Filming of The French Kissers lasted for eight weeks. Some street scenes and interiors of Hervé's flat were filmed in Rennes, Brittany – where the film is set – but the budget was too small for substantial filming in Brittany, so Sattouf tried to find a college in the Paris suburbs that resembled his own in Rennes. Most of the film's interior scenes were shot in Gagny in Paris's eastern suburbs at the Madame-de-Sévigné de Gagny and Eiffel de Gagny colleges. Sattouf used close-ups and unusual compositions when filming the teenagers to "feel their animal side". There was little camera movement to show "there is some heaviness in them; the world is turning around them, they are their own prisoners". He wanted the camera to be held "so close that you could feel their oily skin, every imperfection, and smell their [body odour]".

Soundtrack

The film's original music was written by French electropop musician Lionel Flairs, who performs under the moniker Flairs. It was his first composition for film. When he was approached by Sattouf to compose the soundtrack, Flairs was reluctant because he preferred total freedom when writing music, but after he agreed he enjoyed collaborating with Sattouf. The soundtrack is less like Flairs's usual "happy pop" because Sattouf wanted a sad feel to reflect the sadness in the characters' lives.

Reception
Critical reviews of The French Kissers were positive. The Gazettes Brendan Kelly, who gave the film 4 out of 5 stars, wrote that "Sattouf captures that strange mix of bravado and shyness that is teenage guy-dom, and the result is both frequently hilarious and, finally, quite touching." He thought that Lacoste was "perfect" as Hervé and that the casting of non-professional actors made the film more authentic. Justin Show of Filmink magazine described the film as a "fresh and brutally sincere comedy that strays away from typical teen flicks". In particular, he praised the cinematography, Sattouf's dialogue and Lvovsky's performance. Mike Goodridge wrote for Screen International that the film shows "a nice blend of humour and intelligence that places it somewhere between American Pie and Wild Reeds". He enjoyed the well-known actors' brief appearances and thought that the film's "acute observations and ribald humour" would appeal to adult viewers. The Hollywood Reporters Duane Byrge summarised the film as "a hilarious spin through contemporary French adolescence". Berge found the teenagers' depiction "farcical but realistic" and felt that, like John Hughes's films, a particularly funny aspect was the mockery of authority figures. In a review for Variety magazine, Jordan Mintzer opined that the film comprised "plenty of heart-wrenching gags right in the smacker". Mintzer found some sequences "nauseating" but others "freshly and creatively slapstick", and praised the raw cinematography. David Stratton of At the Movies awarded the film 3.5 stars out of 5, describing it as "a likeable insight into the problems of children who want to grow up very quickly". He called the non-professional teenage cast "terrific", and praised Lvovsky's performance as Hervé's mother. Herald Sun critic Leigh Paatsch found the film "blatantly funny" but also "surprisingly moving". He called Sattouf "a knockout talent behind the camera" and praised the "great humour and honesty" of the story.

References

External links
 
 

2009 films
2009 comedy films
2009 directorial debut films
2000s coming-of-age comedy films
2000s French-language films
2000s teen sex comedy films
Best First Feature Film César Award winners
Films about puberty
Films set in Brittany
Films shot in Île-de-France
French coming-of-age comedy films
French sex comedy films
French teen comedy films
Pathé films
2000s French films